Little Canada is a semi-rural locality in the City of Doncaster in South Yorkshire, England.

The Scawthorpe subdivision within the Adwick le Street built-up area, which only includes Little Canada and not the bulk of Scawthorpe, had a population of 259 at the 2011 census.

History
It was built in the 20th century and most of the houses were made of wood. This, along with the surrounding open flat plateau, resembled the Canadian Prairies, hence the name, Little Canada.

Geography
It is a small, linear settlement consisting of several houses surrounded by countryside. It is located along Green Lane adjacent to the Roman Ridge, with Scawsby Lane going to Scawsby to the south.

It is within the Sprotbrough ward of Doncaster Metropolitan Borough Council which elected two Conservative councillors.

Hamlets in South Yorkshire